Brenda Colvin CBE (1897–1981) was a British landscape architect, author of standard works in the field and a force behind its professionalisation. She was part of the Colvin family, which had long ties to the British Raj.

Biography
Colvin was born in 1897 in India where her father, Sir Elliot Graham Colvin, was a senior administrator in Kashmir and Rajputana.

Colvin received her training in garden design from Madeline Agar at Swanley Horticultural College (now Hadlow College, which continues to teach University of Greenwich courses in the subject). Agar and Colvin worked together on Wimbledon Common. Colvin set up her own practice in 1922; not until 1969 was she joined by Hal Moggridge as partner; the firm continues under their joint names.

Colvin co-founded the Institute of Landscape Architects in 1929 (later the Landscape Institute), and became its president in 1951. She wrote Land and Landscape (1947, revised 1970). In the 1960s Colvin shared an office with Sylvia Crowe, later also president of the ILA (1957–1959). (In 1945, immediately after the end of WW II, Colvin offered a room in her Baker Street offices to Crowe from which Crowe could resume a career in private practice.)

Colvin designed many gardens, e.g. with the socialite Norah Lindsay at the Manor House in Sutton Courtenay, and at Burwarton. She also worked on industrial landscaping, e.g. around power stations, and the University of East Anglia. One of her most historically significant garden designs still remains at Aberystwyth University which is now listed, the listing states "The landscaping of the University of Wales, Aberystwyth campuses, particularly the earlier Penglais campus, is of exceptional historic interest as one of the most important modern landscaping schemes in Wales...One section of the Penglais campus was designed by the well known landscape architect Brenda Colvin and is one of the very few of her schemes to have survived. A number of women have played a key role in the development and planting of the whole site."

Colvin continued her landscape practice into her eighties. Her own garden was at Filkins in the Cotswolds in Gloucestershire, now the office of Colvin and Moggridge. Sometimes the company opens it via the National Garden Scheme.

Partial list of listed gardens
Steeple Manor, Steeple, Dorset (1924, GII)
Sutton Courtenay Manor, Sutton Courtenay, Oxfordshire (1948–51, c.1960 GII)
Morgans Junior School, Hertford, Hertfordshire (1948–49, GII*)
Salisbury Crematorium, Salisbury, Wiltshire (1956–58, GII)

Written work 
 Trees for Town and Country, written with Jacqueline Tyrwhitt. London : Lund Humphries, 1947.
 Land and Landscape.  London: John Murray, 1948. 
 Wonder in a World. London: The Cygnet Press, 1977.

Further reading

References

1897 births
1981 deaths
Brenda
Commanders of the Order of the British Empire
English horticulturists
English gardeners
English landscape architects
English garden writers